Armin Stromberg was a Russian electrochemist, who is most famous of his works in classic polarography and stripping voltammetry.

Stromberg published around 470 papers, around half of them in academic journals, mainly in Russian; and a popular textbook for students called 'Physical Chemistry', also in Russian.

His scientific career started back in 1930 in Yekaterinburg Ural Branch of Russian Academy of Sciences in the laboratory of molten salts. In 1956 he moved to Tomsk Polytechnic University, where he created a large scientific research laboratory developing different aspects of the stripping voltammetry method. During 1963–2003 he supervised 103 PhD students, who successfully defended their thesis on analytical chemistry.

References

Russian physical chemists
1910 births
2004 deaths
Ural State University alumni
Academic staff of Ural State University
German emigrants to the Soviet Union
Soviet physical chemists